Theodore of Antioch may refer to:

Theodore of Mopsuestia (c. 350 – c. 428)
Theodore (Syriac Orthodox patriarch of Antioch) (649–667)
Theodore I of Antioch (750–773), Greek Orthodox patriarch
Theodore II of Antioch (970–976), Greek Orthodox patriarch
Theodore III of Antioch (1034–1042), Greek Orthodox patriarch
Theodore Balsamon, Theodore IV of Antioch (1185–1199), Greek Orthodox patriarch
Theodore of Antioch (philosopher), Syrian philosopher, doctor and translator at the court of Frederick II of Sicily